The Nicolae Iorga Institute of History (abbreviation: IINI) is an institution of research in the field of history under the auspices of the Romanian Academy. The institute is located at 1 Bulevardul Aviatorilor in Sector 1 of Bucharest, Romania.

History

Founded on 1 April 1937 by Romanian historian and its first director, Nicolae Iorga, it was first named the Institute for the Study of Universal History. In 1948, it was renamed the History Institute of the Romanian People's Republic; it acquired the present name in 1965.

Directors of the institute
 Nicolae Iorga (1937–1940)
 Gheorghe I. Brătianu (1940–1947)
 Andrei Oțetea (1947–1948)
 Petre Constantinescu-Iași (1948–1953)
 Victor Cheresteșiu (1953–1956)
 Andrei Oțetea (1956–1970)
 Ștefan Ștefănescu (1970–1989)
  (1990–2001)
  (2001–2006)
 Eugen Denize (2006–2007)
 Ovidiu Cristea (2007–present)

See also
Romanian Academy
Vasile Pârvan Institute of Archaeology
Iași Institute of Archaeology

External links

References

Institutes of the Romanian Academy
Anthropological research institutes
Historical research institutes
1937 establishments in Romania
Scientific organizations established in 1937
Buildings and structures completed in 1939